The 2013 Tour de San Luis was the 7th edition of the Tour de San Luis stage race. It was part of the 2012–2013 UCI America Tour, and took place between 21 and 27 January 2013. The race was won by Daniel Díaz of the  squad, which enjoyed a successful event, as their riders Emmanuel Guevara and Leandro Messineo took the mountains classification and the sprints classification, respectively.

Teams
The twenty-seven teams invited to the race were:

Stages

Stage 1
21 January 2013 — San Luis to Villa Mercedes, 

From that point, the course was mostly a descending false flat to the finish in Villa Mercedes.

A breakaway of seven riders racing for non-World Tour teams formed and enjoyed a lead of eight minutes as they crested the Alto Saladillo. Flavio de Luna from a Mexican selective team was the first atop the climb, which earned him the red jersey for the mountains classification leader at the end of the stage. The remnants of the break were ultimately caught in the closing stages, setting up a bunch sprint finish. Peter Sagan tried to lead-out his teammate Lucas Sebastián Haedo to the line, but a crash occurred in the final  stunting most teams' lead-outs. Mark Cavendish avoided the incident, launching from the  train and won clearly, ahead of rivals Sacha Modolo and Alessandro Petacchi, to take a début victory for his new team, .

Stage 2
22 January 2013 — Tilisarao to Terrazas del Portezuelo, 

The parcours for the second stage was relatively similar to the previous stage, with only one categorised climb – the third-category Alto Paso Grande coming in the first third of the race – during its  itinerary. The finish at Terrazas del Portezuelo provided the riders with a twisty uphill finish, but was still expected to provide a sprint finish.

A five-rider move went clear after  of racing, including Emmanuel Guevara of local team , who was first atop the only climb of the day, moving him level on points with the mountains classification leader, Flavio de Luna. Guevara later had to depart from the breakaway due to him feeling unwell. Sacha Modolo of  derailed the big teams' plans as he beat rivals Mark Cavendish and Leigh Howard in the sprint. Modolo confided afterward that he learned the finish was uphill during the race while chatting with other riders, as he first thought it would be flat. Along with the victory, Modolo assumed the leader's jersey from Cavendish, on countback.

Stage 3
23 January 2013 — La Punta to Mirador del Potrero, 

Stage 3 was denoted as the queen stage of the race, and included two categorised climbs in the opening half of the stage; a third-category climb was followed by the first-category Alto de Nogoli climb, at the midway point. The stage continued up to a summit finish, on the first-category Mirador del Potrero, above Lake Potrero de los Funes.

A breakaway of seven riders went clear early on, and included  teammates Jorge Giacinti and Leandro Messineo. Giacinti was the first rider to cross each of the first two climbs of the day in front, collecting enough points to take the mountains classification jersey. Messineo would also join Giacinti during the post-stage ceremonies, as he won the two intermediate sprints of the stage, which was sufficient to take the sprint classification jersey from Walter Pérez.

The chase was led by a small group which dropped pre-race favourites Alberto Contador, Vincenzo Nibali and Joaquim Rodríguez among others. With that victory, Diniz took the lead in the overall classification from overnight leader Sacha Modolo, stating that his result was "huge" for Brazilian cycling.

Stage 4
24 January 2013 — San Luis, individual time trial (ITT)

At the  point, Kwiatkowski had recorded the fastest time, some eleven seconds quicker than Tuft, however Tuft's second element of the stage allowed him to move up to the stage victory. After his victory, Tuft said that the wind was a major factor on the course.

Stage 5
25 January 2013 — Juana Koslay to Carolina, 

The first  of Stage 5 were mostly flat, before two categorised climbs within the final . The terrain then became mostly flat until the finish line in Carolina.

Enjoying the tailwind, the duo had a maximum gap of seventeen minutes. Kwiatkowski himself was struggling on the climb, and was soon distanced, and ensured that the leader's jersey would change hands again. Alberto Contador and Daniel Díaz attacked, but Contador could not sustain the tempo set by Díaz, and fell back to the small group containing van Garderen. Díaz almost made the junction with his fading teammate Guevara, finishing fifteen seconds behind. Guevara barely had the strength for a victory salute, as he crossed the line by swerving dangerously. The stage was a double success for their  team, since Díaz had gained enough time to move in the first spot of the general classification.

Stage 6
26 January 2013 — Quines to Merlo–Mirador del Sol, 

Stage 6 was the last mountain stage of the Tour. It contained three categorised climbs, starting with the second-category Alto de Cantana in the first half of the race. It was being used in the race for the second consecutive year as a summit finish, as in 2012, Alberto Contador won ahead of Daniel Díaz, but was later stripped of the result.

A breakaway of four riders formed, consisting of Marc de Maar, Mauro Finetto, Adriano Malori and Pieter Weening. Diego Rosa joined them later on, and the group maintained an advantage of three minutes over much of the course, until they were caught at the foot of the Mirador del Sol. The group was reduced to about a dozen riders when Contador accelerated in sight of the flamme rouge, creating a sizable gap. Díaz managed to get back to him, before Contador kicked again in the closing stages to win, but Díaz followed him, just two seconds in arrears.  rider Alex Correia Diniz caught the duo shortly before the finish line, and also finished two seconds back. Van Garderen, second in the overall classification, lost eighteen seconds to Contador and found himself 33 seconds in arrears of Díaz, with Diniz a close third at 39 seconds.

Stage 7
27 January 2013 — San Luis to Juana Koslay, 

Going into the stage, the mountains classification was led by Emmanuel Guevara, but he had the same number of points (16) as Alex Correia Diniz, meaning the only categorised climb would determine the winner of that competition. However, neither rider were in a position to score points; thus Guevara won the King of the Mountains competition of the Tour.

The breakaway of the day was composed of eight riders, with Michał Kwiatkowski the best-ranked overall in the general classification, 3' 32" behind race leader Daniel Díaz. The finishing mass sprint was won by Mattia Gavazzi, his first victory since returning from a 30-month doping ban; his last victory came at the Settimana Ciclistica Lombarda in 2010. Díaz finished with the main group, and won the overall classification. His team, enjoyed other successes; adding to Guevara's mountains victory, Leandro Messineo won the sprints classification.

Classification leadership table

References

External links
 

Tour de San Luis
Tour de San Luis
Tour de San Luis
January 2013 sports events in South America